The Lang Ayre is a beach on the west side of Ronas Hill, Northmavine, Shetland. At  in length it is the archipelago's longest. It is accessed either by a long walk from the top of Collafirth Hill down the Burn of Monius, or by sea.

Etymology 
The name Lang Ayre comes from the Shetland dialect words lang (long) and ayre (shingle beach).

Access 
Many walkers visiting the beach also undertake a walk to the summit of  Ronas Hill en route. The beach is most easily accessed on land by following the Burn of Monius down a steep-sided ravine east of Ketligill Head. The final descent down to the beach is aided by a rope which is left at the site for public use. The route most commonly taken to reach the Lang Ayre over Ronas Hill is prone to low-lying mist, so walkers are advised to be familiar with the use of a map and compass to be able to navigate back in poor visibility. The beach can also be accessed by sea, often by canoe or kayak, taking the most sheltered route via the Blade, Ronas Voe. The beach is directly exposed to the Atlantic Ocean, so westerly and north-westerly winds can be challenging to those small craft.

References

Sources 

 
 
 
 
 
 
 
 

Beaches of Scotland
Northmavine